The Cup of Nations is an invitational women's soccer tournament held early in the year in Australia. In the first edition (in 2019), it was contested by Australia, Argentina, South Korea, and New Zealand.

On 12 January 2023, Football Australia confirmed the second edition would involve hosts Australia, Jamaica, Spain and Czech Republic.

The Cup of Nations is a tournament similar to the Algarve Cup, the Arnold Clark Cup, the Cyprus Women's Cup, the Istria Cup, the Pinatar Cup, the SheBelieves Cup, the Tournoi de France, the Turkish Women's Cup and the Women's Revelations Cup.

Editions

Statistics

All-time table

Participating nations

References

External links
Official website

 
International women's association football competitions hosted by Australia
International women's association football invitational tournaments
Recurring sporting events established in 2019
2019 establishments in Australia
March sporting events